Ramon Cecchini (born 30 August 1990) is a Swiss footballer who plays for SC Cham.

Career
On 8 August 2019 it was confirmed, that Cecchini had joined SC Cham on a deal until 30 June 2020.

International career
Cecchini is a youth international for Switzerland.

Honours

Vaduz
 Swiss Challenge League (1): 2013–14
 Liechtenstein Football Cup (5): 2012–13, 2013–14, 2014–15, 2015–16, 2016-17

References

1990 births
Living people
Swiss men's footballers
Switzerland youth international footballers
Swiss people of Italian descent
Swiss Super League players
Swiss Challenge League players
Swiss Promotion League players
FC Vaduz players
Swiss expatriate footballers
Swiss expatriate sportspeople in Liechtenstein
Expatriate footballers in Liechtenstein
FC Winterthur players
SC Young Fellows Juventus players
SC Cham players
Association football midfielders
People from Winterthur
Sportspeople from the canton of Zürich